The genus Nimbacinus contains two species of carnivorous, quadrupedal marsupials in Australia both of which are extinct:
 Nimbacinus dicksoni Muirhead & Archer, 1990
 Nimbacinus richi Murray & Megirian, 2000

The name of the genus combines Nimba and cinus, derived from a word meaning "little" in the Wanyi language, indigenous peoples associated with the Riversleigh fossil site, and the Ancient Greek word kynos, meaning dog,

References 

Prehistoric thylacines
Prehistoric marsupial genera
Extinct mammals of Australia